Richard Alan Simmons (October 11, 1924 – November 13, 2004) was a Canadian-American screenwriter.

Simmons was born in Toronto, Ontario, Canada and served in the Royal Canadian Air Force during World War II. After the war, he graduated from the University of Toronto and then moved to California for a job with NBC radio, writing news and radio dramas. He moved into movies.

He wrote the 1961 TV script for "The Price of Tomatoes" episode on "The Dick Powell Show," which was nominated for a writing Emmy and won an Emmy for star Peter Falk.

He was survived by his wife of 53 years, Emily; three children and three grandchildren.

Select credits
The Lady Wants Mink (1953)
War Paint (1953)
Beachhead (1954)
The Yellow Tomahawk (1954)
Shield for Murder (1954)
Three Hours to Kill (1954)
Bengal Brigade (1954)
The Looters (1955)
The Private War of Major Benson (1955)
Female on the Beach (1955)
Congo Crossing (1956)
The King and Four Queens (1956)
Istanbul (1957)
The Fuzzy Pink Nightgown (1957)
Outlaw's Son (1957)
Tarawa Beachhead (1958)
The Trap (1959)
The Dick Powell Show
Della (1964)
The Art of Love (1965)
The Trials of O'Brien
Fear No Evil (1969)
Ritual of Evil (1970)
Hitched (1971)
Lock, Stock and Barrel (1971)
Banyon (1971)
Skin Game (1971) - story
Columbo
Juggernaut (1974)
The Lives of Jenny Dolan (1975)
Mrs. Columbo (1979–80) - creator
Harry's Hong Kong (1987)

References

External links
Richard Alan Simmons at IMDb

1924 births
2004 deaths
Canadian emigrants to the United States
Writers from Toronto
20th-century Canadian screenwriters
20th-century American screenwriters
Royal Canadian Air Force personnel of World War II